Aeolian landforms are features produced by either the erosive or constructive action of the wind. 
These features may be built up from sand or snow, or eroded into rock, snow, or ice.
Aeolian landforms are commonly observed in sandy deserts and on frozen lakes or sea ice and have been observed and studied across Earth and on other planets, including Mars
and Pluto

Terminology
The word "aeolian" derives from Æolus, the Greek god of the winds, and the son of Hellen and the nymph Orseis, and a brother of Dorus, Xuthus and Amphictyon.

Mechanisms

Aeolian landforms are formed when wind moves sediment (see aeolian processes).
Sediment particles move when they are lifted by upwards Bernoulli forces that exceed their downwards weight or when they are dragged from their initial position. Depending on the balance of these forces, particles may either creep (roll) across the surface until they settle due to a loss of velocity; hop from point to point; or be suspended entirely in the air. These means of sediment transport can be classified as deposition, saltation, and suspension, respectively. 
Once sediment transport begins, it continues via gravity and momentum. Particles that fall out of the air typically impact the surface with enough force to dislodge further particles.

These impacts are separated in space by the saltation hop length of the traveling particles, which creates distinct areas of erosion and/or deposition.
As time passes, the surface rises in areas with net deposition, and lowers in areas with net erosion, creating initial landforms.
Larger aeolian landforms alter the surface wind field in patterns that promote their growth. They are thus very stable, once formed.

Deflation and abrasion are specific means of sediment transport than can also be attributed to aeolian processes. Deflation, which is named for the Latin word "deflare" meaning "to blow away", refers to the scattering and removal of rock particles by wind. Deflation occurs in deserts where diverse particles dominate the surface. In these arid zones, sand and rock fragments are blown by jets and streams of air which remove fine grained materials from the surface and leave behind a rocky desert. Abrasion is another mechanism of force exerted by the wind on surficial materials that is characterized by friction caused by moving particles scraping across a rock's surface and, as a result, continues to develop a land formation by removing further material.

Aeolian landforms are typically described in two categories: erosional and depositional.

Types of landforms

Depositional 
Depositional landforms grow when sediment is deposited into an area faster than it is removed. These landforms grow from snow, sand, and/or dust in areas where wind patterns trap particles. For example, the Great Sand Dunes in Colorado grow as sand blown from a wide plain is deposited against the edge of the Sangre de Cristo mountains.
Some depositional landforms include dunes,  barchan dunes, ripple marks, and loess.

Erosional 
Erosional landforms grow when more sediment is removed from an area faster than it is deposited. They are widespread in hardened, wind-swept snow surfaces, such as the Antarctic Plateau: see sastrugi.
In sand and rock, they are rarely preserved except in arid regions. 
Outside of arid regions, moving water - which is heavier and more erosive than wind - erases aeolian landforms. 
Large basins are complex and there is often one or more non-aeolian process at work, including tectonics, glacial and alluvial forces. There are several types of landforms associated with erosion.

See also

References

External links

 
Erosion landforms